Rivea is a genus of plants in the bindweed family Convolvulaceae.

The following species are recognised in the genus Rivea:

Rivea hypocrateriformis (Desr.) Choisy
Rivea ornata (Roxb.) Choisy
Rivea wightiana R.R.Mill

References

Convolvulaceae
Convolvulaceae genera
Taxa named by Jacques Denys Choisy